Belye Berega is a rural locality in Naumovsky Selsoviet Rural Settlement, Konyshyovsky District, Kursk Oblast, Russia. Population:

Geography 
The village is located on the Svapa River (a right tributary of the Seym River), 44 km from the Russia–Ukraine border, 85 km north-west of Kursk, 24 km north-west of the district center – the urban-type settlement Konyshyovka, 11 km from the selsoviet center – Naumovka.

 Climate
Belye Berega has a warm-summer humid continental climate (Dfb in the Köppen climate classification).

Transport 
Belye Berega is located 36 km from the federal route  Ukraine Highway, 56 km from the route  Crimea Highway, 16 km from the route  (Trosna – M3 highway), 14 km from the road of regional importance  (Fatezh – Dmitriyev), 23 km from the road  (Konyshyovka – Zhigayevo – 38K-038), 2.5 km from the road  (Dmitriyev – Beryoza – Menshikovo – Khomutovka), on the road of intermunicipal significance  (Makaro-Petrovskoye – Belye Berega), 8.5 km from the nearest railway station Arbuzovo (railway lines Navlya – Lgov-Kiyevsky and Arbuzovo – Luzhki-Orlovskiye).

The rural locality is situated 91 km from Kursk Vostochny Airport, 182 km from Belgorod International Airport and 290 km from Voronezh Peter the Great Airport.

References

Notes

Sources

Rural localities in Konyshyovsky District